Chiang Mai (Thai for "New City") is a major city in northern Thailand.

It may also refer to:

 Chiang Mai Initiative
 Chiang Mai International Airport
 Chiang Mai University
 Diocese of Chiang Mai
 Amphoe Mueang Chiang Mai, the central district of Chiang Mai
 Chiang Mai Province in Thailand
 Kingdom of Chiang Mai (1802–1899)
 Lanna (1292–1775), also known as the Kingdom of Chiang Mai
 Chiang Mai Lake, another name for the imaginary Lake Chimay
 Chiangmai Sign Language

See also
 Chiang Rai
 Chengmai County